The following is a list of São Paulo Futebol Clube managers throughout the club's history. From the foundation of the club on January 26, 1930, there have been 83 head coaches -  67 Brazilian nationals, and 16 foreigners including five Uruguayans, five Argentines, three Hungarians, one Portuguese, one Chilean and one Colombian. Twenty one managers have won official titles by Tricolor resulting in 12 international and 29 national honours.

The first coach in São Paulo's history was Rubens Salles, a former defensive midfielder of extinct Club Athletico Paulistano, who played as a professional between 1906 and 1920. Salles led the team for 4 years, in the period which the club was known as São Paulo da Floresta, winning the Campeonato Paulista (State of São Paulo league) in 1931 and being runners-up in 1930, 1932 and 1933. He also participated in the campaign that led Tricolor to the second place in 1934. His career ended prematurely due to his death on July 21 of the same year.

The club underwent rapid changes following Salles's death, facing internal disagreements and fast dissociations which culminated in the closure and rebuilding of football activities in December 1935. Since then, the team remained for eight years without a title, 12 altogether from 1931 that were interrupted by the group's of Portuguese coach Joreca. He coached the Tricolor between the years 1943 and 1947 when he won state championships of 1943 (without defeat under his command), 1945 (with only two setbacks) and 1946 (undefeated).

In the subsequent years from the successful seasons of Joreca by São Paulo, the club won two titles in a row in 1948 and 1949 under command of the famous manager Vicente Feola who had coached the team on several occasions. Feola would be later known for leading the Brazil to their first World Cup title in 1958, defeating Sweden. The team came back to win the state title in 1953 with the Argentine Jim Lopes and 1958 under the command of experienced Hungarian coach Béla Guttmann, who coached other major teams, such as Milan, Peñarol, Porto and S.L. Benfica.

The 60s was marked by another title drought, this time influenced by the construction of Morumbi Stadium and the period of hegemony of rivals Santos and Palmeiras who dominated"the state and national tournaments from 1958 to 1969.

Tricolor returned to the top of the state championship in 1970 with Zezé Moreira, in 1971 with Osvaldo Brandão and 1975 under the command of Argentine club idol José Poy. Poy played goalkeeper in São Paulo from 1948 to 1962 and was considered for an appointment as manager for the Brazil in the 1954 World Cup. After his retirement, Poy helped the club on the construction of Morumbi having sold nearly 8000 titles of guaranteed spots, one of the main sources of income of the work. The former goalkeeper led the team in 5 occasions, reaching remarkable results as the vice championships in the state league in 1982, and national league of 1971 and 1973, and to the 1974 Copa Libertadores, losing to the most successful club in the history of continental tournament, then four-time champions, Independiente.

The national title that had was not achieved under the command of Poy was finally achieved by Rubens Minelli in 1977 who had been the winning coach in the two previous editions on the managing of Internacional, becoming the first head coach to won three Brazilian league titles in a row and the first by São Paulo.  The event was taken in a single final match against Atlético Mineiro in Belo Horizonte. After regulation, the score was 0-0, but São Paulo won a 3-2 penalty shootout victory by in front of 102,974 rival supporters.

In the 80s, São Paulo had winning seasons - adding 5 more state titles along with a second national title in 1986. Carlos Alberto Silva made two quick successful rounds at the seasons of 1980-81 and 1989-90 when reached 2 titles of Campeonato Paulista respectively in 1980 and 1989. In the following years with Formiga, 1981, and Cilinho for 2 times, 1985 and 1987, The Dearest won the state championship again. The second national trophy became in 1986 with an young group players who was called as Menudos do Morumbi in reference to the famous 70s Puerto Rican boy band Menudo (band). The team was trained by former player and 2 times world champion Pepe that received a group assembled by Cilinho. The team was formed by promising players as Müller, Silas and Sidney; and experienced like Daryo Pereira, Careca and Pita.

The 90s decade was the most victory period of Tricolor's history, under the command of Telê Santana, who was called as Mestre Telê (Master Telê) by the fans, the club won 7 international tournaments in only 3 years, from 1992 to 1994, among the Copa Libertadores and Intercontinental Cup in 1992 and 1993; the Recopa Sudamericana in 1993 and 1994 along the Supercopa Sudamericana in 1993. During the 6 years who trained the team Telê broke a Brazilian stigma created in the 80s due his participations in the 1982 and 1986 FIFA World Cup when the coach was eliminated with Brazil National Team at the final stage of the tournament. In 1994, the assistant coach Muricy Ramalho, who made history playing for São Paulo in the 70s, took an important place again by winning the Copa Conmebol with only young and reserve players when the team was called as Expressinho (Little Express Train) in refer to the performance of the club during the tournament.  In 1996 Telê Santana left the club after 6 years and then the team passed for a long period of fewer and inexpressive titles. Tricolor was champion in the Campeonato Paulista in 1998 being trained by Nelsinho Baptista and won it again 2 years later.

Between 2005 and 2008, the club enjoyed a successful spell under the management of Paulo Autuori, who won the 2005 Copa Libertadores and the 2005 FIFA Club World Cup, and then with the return of Muricy Ramalho, who won three league titles in a row. Ney Franco is the manager to have most recently an honour for the club, the 2012 Copa Sudamericana.

List of managers
Figures correct as of 13 March 2023. Includes all official matches
This list of all managers includes performance records and honours.
P = Matches played; W = Matches won; D = Matches drawn; L = Matches lost; GF = Goals for; GA = Goals against

Managers with honours

Notes and references

External links
 Official website
 Official website

São Paulo
 
Futebol